Gram-mole (more correctly Gram-molecule) is a synonym for Mole. See:

 Mole (unit)
 Molar mass